Nicholas Kalmar (born 15 October 1987) is an Australian soccer player who plays for Dandenong City.

Club career
After his departure from Sunshine George Cross in 2007 he had a stint in Croatia before returning to Australia. On 29 June 2010 he signed a one-year contract with Melbourne Heart after impressing head coach, John van 't Schip, in several trials and friendlies before the start of the 2010-2011 A-league season. On 26 December 2014, Kalmar signed to Western Sydney Wanderers on a short-term injury replacement contract. In June 2016, Kalmar joined Victoria State League 2 North-West club Geelong SC, managed by close friend and former teammate Steve Laurie.

References

External links
 Melbourne Heart profile

1987 births
Living people
Altona East Phoenix players
Arema F.C. players
Melbourne Knights FC players
Melbourne City FC players
Nick Kalmar
A-League Men players
Nick Kalmar
Australian soccer players
Western Sydney Wanderers FC players
Association football midfielders
Association football forwards
Australian expatriate sportspeople in Indonesia
Australian expatriate sportspeople in Thailand
Australian expatriate soccer players
Expatriate footballers in Thailand
Expatriate footballers in Indonesia
Soccer players from Melbourne